Marita Payne-Wiggins (born October 7, 1960) is a Canadian former track and field athlete who competed in two consecutive Summer Olympics. She is the co-Canadian record holder in the 400 metres, along with Jillian Richardson, and previously held the Canadian record in the 200 metres.

Early life and education
Payne was born in Barbados and spent her early childhood in Christ Church, Barbados. As a young child, her parents, Ina and Clarence Payne, moved to New York City for school and work, leaving her behind in Barbados. In 1970, when Payne was nine, she rejoined her parents and the family settled in Toronto, Ontario, and later in Concord, Ontario. She attended Vaughan Road Collegiate Institute in Toronto, where she blossomed into a star sprinter, becoming an Ontario provincial champion in both the senior 100 metres and 200 metres in 1979.

In 1980, Payne enrolled at Florida State University (FSU), where she competed for the Seminoles track and field team before graduating in 1984. A 21-time NCAA All-American, she was a 400 metres national champion in 1982 and 1984; a 4 × 100 metres relay national champion in 1981, 1983, and 1984; an indoor 4 × 200 metres relay national champion in 1981; and a 4 × 400 metres relay national champion in 1983 and 1984. Payne also met her husband Mitchell Wiggins at FSU, while he played for the Seminoles basketball team.

Career
Payne began competing for Canada at the 1979 Pan American Games, where she won a bronze medal with the 4 × 400 metres relay team. In 1981, she was a member of the Americas 4 × 400 metres relay team that took bronze at the IAAF World Cup in Rome. The following year, at the Commonwealth Games, she won a silver medal with the Canadian team in the 4 × 100 metres relay, and was a 400 metres semi-finalist.

Payne won a silver medal in the 200 metres, at the 1983 Universiade, and helped Canada win silver medals in both the 4 × 100 and 4 × 400 metre relays. That year, she also won a silver medal in the 4 × 400 metres relay at the Pan American Games. She competed in the inaugural World Championships two weeks earlier. At the championships, held in Helsinki, she finished fifth in the 400 metres – the best performance by a non-European athlete in the discipline, breaking the existing Commonwealth record with a time of 50.06. She also teamed up with her Canadian compatriots in the 4 × 100 and 4 × 400 metres relay events, where they finished fifth and fourth in the finals, respectively.

At the 1984 Summer Olympics, held in Los Angeles, Payne won a silver medal in the 4 × 400 metres relay with her teammates Charmaine Crooks, Jillian Richardson and Molly Killingbeck. She also competed with her teammates Angela Bailey, Angella Taylor-Issajenko and France Gareau in the 4 × 100 metres relay, in which the team also won a silver medal. She finished fourth in the individual 400 metres, establishing a new Canadian record (49.91).

Payne helped the Canadian 4 × 400 metres relay team win a gold medal, and finished fourth in the individual 400 metres race, at the 1986 Commonwealth Games. In 1987, she won her second silver medal in the 4 × 400 metres relay at the Pan American Games. A few weeks later, she reached the semi-finals of the 400 metres at the World Championships, and along with Crooks, Killingbeck and Richardson, she took Canada to the fourth position in the 4 × 400 metres relay. The team reunited for the 1988 Summer Olympics in Seoul, but failed to finish in the relay final. She was a semi-finalist in the individual 400 metres race. Shortly after the Olympics, she retired from track and field.

Post career
Payne was inducted into the FSU Hall of Fame in 1991. Ten years later, she was inducted into the Canadian Olympic Hall of Fame.

The City of Vaughan, Ontario named a park in her honour. Marita Payne Park, located in Concord, where she was raised, is also within walking distance of her family's current residence in Vaughan.

Personal life
Payne is the wife of former NBA player Mitchell Wiggins. Their son Andrew was selected first overall in the 2014 NBA draft by the Cleveland Cavaliers. He was then traded to the Minnesota Timberwolves. He currently plays for the Golden State Warriors. They have two other sons, Nick, who played basketball for the Wichita State Shockers and Mitchell II, and three daughters: Stephanie, Angelica, and Taya. Since 2002, the family has resided in Vaughan.

Achievements
Two-time Canadian 400 metres champion (1981, 1984)
Co-holder of Canadian 400 metres record with Jillian Richardson (49.91)
Previous holder of Canadian 200 metres record (22.62)

Angella Taylor-Issajenko's record of 22.25 was later annulled, due to doping violations.

See also
 Canadian records in track and field

References

External links
 
 
 
 
 
 
 

1960 births
Living people
Athletes from Toronto
Athletes (track and field) at the 1979 Pan American Games
Athletes (track and field) at the 1982 Commonwealth Games
Athletes (track and field) at the 1986 Commonwealth Games
Athletes (track and field) at the 1983 Pan American Games
Athletes (track and field) at the 1987 Pan American Games
Athletes (track and field) at the 1984 Summer Olympics
Athletes (track and field) at the 1988 Summer Olympics
Barbadian emigrants to Canada
Black Canadian track and field athletes
Canadian female sprinters
Commonwealth Games gold medallists for Canada
Commonwealth Games silver medallists for Canada
Commonwealth Games medallists in athletics
Florida State Seminoles women's track and field athletes
Florida State University alumni
Medalists at the 1984 Summer Olympics
Olympic silver medalists for Canada
Olympic track and field athletes of Canada
Pan American Games silver medalists for Canada
Pan American Games bronze medalists for Canada
Pan American Games medalists in athletics (track and field)
World Athletics Championships athletes for Canada
People from Christ Church, Barbados
People from Vaughan
Black Canadian sportswomen
Olympic silver medalists in athletics (track and field)
Universiade medalists in athletics (track and field)
Universiade silver medalists for Canada
Medalists at the 1983 Summer Universiade
Medalists at the 1979 Pan American Games
Medalists at the 1987 Pan American Games
Olympic female sprinters
Medallists at the 1982 Commonwealth Games
Medallists at the 1986 Commonwealth Games